The 1938 Richmond Spiders football team was an American football team that represented the University of Richmond as a member of the Southern Conference (SoCon) during the 1938 college football season. In their fifth season under head coach Glenn Thistlethwaite, Richmond compiled a 6–3–1 record, with a mark of 3–2–1 in conference play, finishing in fifth place in the SoCon.

Schedule

References

Richmond
Richmond Spiders football seasons
Richmond Spiders football